Tsvetan Vasilev (also spelled Tzvetan Vassilev; ; born 1959) is a Bulgarian entrepreneur. He is the former majority shareholder and chairman of the supervisory board of Corporate Commercial Bank, the fifth-largest Bulgarian bank based on assets, which collapsed in 2014 after a bank run. Vasilev argues the bank faced a corporate raiding attack orchestrated by media mogul and politician Delyan Peevski with the help of Bulgaria's Prosecutor's Office and the Bulgarian central bank, so that its most attractive assets could be stolen. Vasilev has submitted an application under the US Global Magnitsky Act against Delyan Peevski and Bulgaria's General Prosecutor Sotir Tsatsarov. He successfully challenged the withdrawal of the bank's license before the European Court of Human Rights which established violations of the right to property and the right to a fair trial. Depositors at the Corporate Commercial Bank have submitted a claim against Peevski, the Bulgarian National Bank and others under the US Racketeer Influenced and Corrupt Organizations Act: they argue that the defendants engaged in fraud after the bank's closure to deviate assets. Vasilev currently lives in exile in Serbia where he was granted political asylum.

Years of Bloom 

Vasilev is former chairman of the supervisory board of Corporate Commercial Bank AD, the fifth bank in Bulgaria based on assets, which collapsed after a bank run in 2014. as well as its majority shareholder.
Tsvetan Vasilev is also former chairman of the supervisory board of Victoria FATA Insurance as well as the supervisory board of Vivacom, a Bulgarian telecom company. Vasilev is the recipient of the badge of honor of the University of National and World Economy in Sofia and Doctor Honoris Causa of the "St Ivan Rilski" University of Mining and Geology.

Education 
Tsvetan Vasilev holds a master's degree in International Economic Relations from the University of National and World Economy. After graduation, he worked as a research fellow in economics at the Center of Foreign Trade and International Markets for seven years.

Early career 

Tsvetan Vasilev started his career in finance in 1992 when he founded his brokerage company Bromak EOOD and his investment intermediary Fina-S AD. Between 1995 and 1999 he headed the Foreign Exchange Operations and Liquidity Department of Central Cooperative Bank, and in 1997 he also became member of the bank's board of directors. In 1999 he left Central Cooperative Bank to head the Markets and Liquidity Department at CB Bulgaria Invest (now Allianz Bulgaria Commercial Bank).

Corporate Commercial Bank ("Corpbank") 
Between 2000 and 2003, Vasilev served as chairman of the executive board and executive director of Corporate Commercial Bank AD. In 2003 he became its majority shareholder and chairman of its supervisory board.

Entrepreneurial and innovative investments 
By 2014, Corpbank was Bulgaria's fourth-largest bank. The bank held an extensive portfolio of companies and was the only bank in Bulgaria investing in start-ups and entrepreneurs. Because the bank was making these types of investments that no other banks were doing, its profits and regional power grew. Until its destruction by Bulgarian regulators and the looting of its assets, Corpbank was arguably the most innovative and entrepreneurial bank in the Balkans.

Starting from scratch in 2001, it was a pioneer in export financing to Bulgarian energy producers and ammunition manufacturers previously without banking options. Unlike its rivals, Corpbank also made direct investments in its clients and emerging enterprises in Bulgaria, most notably the country's leading telecom Vivacom, which it bought from creditors along with affiliates of VTB Capital in 2012. Vivacom is the leading market provider in Bulgaria for a variety of telecommunications services, including landline, mobile, Internet, radio, and TV. It has approximately 3,500 employees. Vassilev saw the opportunity and raised the capital to make the purchase.

Experts claim that the Vivacom deal was amidst the most complicated ones on the Bulgarian financial market. The restructuring was approved by the European Commission and the international creditors of Vivacom. Prior to the acquisition by Vasilev and VTB Capital, Vivacom had incurred significant debt after a buyout by AIG in 2007, which subsequently sold its shares to PineBridge Investments.

The company's 2013 financial report showed considerable improvement: EBITDA increased from BGN 267 million to BGN 339 million.

"Sudden" run on the bank 
Because of its growth, wealth, and power, in April 2014 one of the most influential political parties in Bulgaria (DPS) visited Vassilev. The request was simple: transfer assets for free to the "mobster circle of DPS." Vassilev refused.

Suddenly, by June and July 2014, Corpbank customers withdrew cash in a panic. Prior to the bank run, several Bulgarian media outlets ran stories accusing Vassilev of trying to organize the murder of a media titan who had close connections to the government, Delyan Peevski. Prosecutors raided companies affiliated with Corpbank. They confiscated financial documents from those companies. TV stations ran live feeds of the prosecution's raids. Over the course of 4 days, over 20 percent of Corpbank's assets were withdrawn in cash by depositors.

After the bank run, Corpbank was closed for six months. Customers could not get money out. The Bulgarian government's currency board denied the Bulgarian National Bank (BNB) from creating money to pay Corpbank's customers. According to Forbes, "Paying off depositors was therefore impossible. But reopening the bank was not an option either since that would simply re-start the run. Therefore, the BNB kept the bank "on ice".

Bank collapse and shutdown 
In June 2014, Corpbank collapsed following a bank run during which the equivalent of nearly 20% of its assets were withdrawn. Corpbank was officially shut down and placed under the special supervision of the Bulgarian National Bank on 20 June 2014 after a request by its management. The bank's management applied for special supervision because the Bulgarian National Bank refused to provide liquidity support. According to media reports at that time, the shutdown was due to a dispute between Vassilev and "Bulgarian media oligarch Delyan Peevski."

Civil and criminal charges 

After spending some time in Austria, Vasilev is currently residing in Belgrade, Serbia where he was granted political asylum. He voluntarily surrendered to Serbian police officers on 16 September 2014. In March 2015, the Appellate Court of Belgrade ruled against an extradition request by the Bulgarian authorities. The Appellate Court of Belgrade conclusively refused to extradite Vasilev to Bulgaria in May 2022.

After inexplicably modifying charges several times, in July 2017 Bulgaria's prosecution indicted Vasilev with embezzlement along with 17 other people. According to Reuters, the case is "seen as one of the Balkan nation's biggest post-communist fraud investigations". The Prosecutor's Office set a record by drafting an indictment which is more than 5000 pages long: Bulgaria's Deputy General Prosecutor Ivan Geshev has compared writing it to landing on the Moon with a diesel engine and transplanting a brain. However, it has been observed that two-thirds of the indictment do not seem to be related to the charges.

Vasilev argues that the charges against him are political. He has successfully challenged the withdrawal of the bank's license before the European Court of Human Rights which established violations of the right to property and the right to a fair trial.  In August 2017, he also submitted an application under the US Magnitsky Act, which sanctions corrupt government officials implicated in human rights abuses, against Bulgaria's General Prosecutor Sotir Tsatsarov and media mogul and Member of Parliament Delyan Peevski. His application has been supported by Bill Richardson.

"Delyan Peevski is simply one of the main tools that the Bulgarian political mafia uses to blackmail Bulgarian business—the visible part of a rather large iceberg of corruption," Vassilev said in a Forbes interview. "The political mafia is persistently trying to downgrade what happened to Corpbank to a personal conflict between Mr. Peevski and me, which is utterly untrue. I had a conflict with the political mafia ruling the country, which has been blackmailing and threatening me for many years."

In 2019, Bulgarian authorities arrested key witnesses in the ongoing trial: critics argue this is an illegitimate attempt to influence their testimonies. The government is also going after Vasilev's wife who is a university professor by raising charges. Meanwhile, the government amended Bulgaria's criminal codes in a rush several times: in the eyes of Bulgarian jurist Tatyana Doncheva, these amendments were made to help the Prosecutor's Office in the trial against Vasilev by compromising the equality of arms in criminal proceedings and by making it easier to convict people based on fabricated charges. The Association of Bulgarian Judges has deemed that many of these amendments are anti-constitutional.

Corpbank's assets after the forced shutdown

After Corpbank's shutdown, insolvency proceedings were officially initiated. Corpbank's clients, however, repeatedly warned that Bulgaria's authorities were violating the creditors' interests. Media reported that assets were deviated by companies and persons allegedly affiliated with Delyan Peevski and the witnesses against Vasilev.

Vasilev also argues that Bulgarian authorities close their eyes to irregularities in the insolvency proceedings. He was concerned about the fate of Corpbank's strategic assets, such as Vivacom. In particular, VTB Capital controlled 33% of Vivacom through their daughter company Crusher even though they were not the true owner as the price of the shares had already been paid by Corpbank's SPV Technological Center-Institute for Microelectronics (TC-IME). In murky circumstances, the shares of Vivacom were sold by VTB Capital at a devalued rate at a tender in London to Bulgarian Spas Rousev in September 2016. There is pending litigation before the London High Court for allegedly illegal seizure of the equity stake in Vivacom. Vasilev has raised concern that Vivacom's new owners would probably fail to pay the company's debt to Corpbank and would hurt the interests of the creditors in the insolvency proceedings. It has been suggested that Spas Rousev is a strawman of Delyan Peevski.

In the past, Vasilev had tried to strike a deal with a Belgian investor who was supposed to find financing for Vivacom's debt towards Corpbank, but it fell through.

Citizenship 

Tsvetan Vasilev is Doctor Honoris Causa of the "St. Ivan Rilski" University of Mining and Geology. He is also recipient of the Honorary Badge of the University of National and World Economy and a member of the university's board of trustees. He has authored a number of publications analyzing the financial challenges before Bulgaria and the European Union.

Vasilev is a frequent guest of various international economic forums, such as the Wroclaw Global Forum and the Black Sea Energy and Economic Summit.

Vasilev has sponsored many initiatives in various fields, including scientific research, development of sports, support of orphanages, renovation of churches and monasteries, etc.

He is the main benefactor of PFC Botev Plovdiv, the oldest football club in Bulgaria. Vasilev's efforts are concentrated on the development of the football club and its junior football academy.

Awards 

Tsvetan Vasilev has received a number of prestigious awards. He has been the recipient of The Banker newspaper "Banker of the Year" award for his personal contributions to the Bulgarian economy and banking several times:
Award for Dynamic Banking Management as Chairman of the Management Board of Corporate Commercial Bank AD in 2004
Award for Promoting Bulgarian Capital in Bulgaria's Banking System in 2008
Market Stability Special Award in 2010
Award for Efficient Policy and Long-Lasting Presence on the Bulgarian Market in 2013
In 2011 he received the Mr. Economy award (the grand award of the Economics magazine in Bulgaria) for overall contribution to the development of the Bulgarian economy. In 2012 Vasilev received an award for his overall contribution to the development of motorcycle sports in Bulgaria by the Bulgarian Motorcycle Federation.

Personal life 

Tsvetan Vasilev is married to Professor Antoaneta Vassileva, Dean of the International Economics and Politics Faculty of the University of National and World Economy.

See also

 Corporate Commercial Bank
 Vivacom

References

External links 
An Individual Approach, An Interview with Tzvetan Vassilev, Chairman, Corporate Commercial Bank, Leaders Magazine, October 2011 
Vassilev: Energy and Economic Co-operation Key to Black Sea Region Growth, New Europe, November 2011 
The President Defends Business Interests, Der Standard, 24 March 2013 
Tzvetan Vassilev's Articles for New Europe 
GERB's Ambitions to Govern Bulgaria are Not to be Taken Seriously, Pressadaily.bg, 3 August 2013 
 Interview with Tzvetan Vassilev, Deutsche Welle, October 2013 
 "For Whom the Bell Tolls and is There Something Rotten in Brussels?," Analysis by Tzvetan Vassilev, New Europe, January 2014 
Bulgarians are Not the Biggest Danger, Interview with Tzvetan Vassilev, Handelsblatt, January 2014 
Bulgaria's Failed Corpbank: The Former Owner's Story, Forbes 2015 

Bulgarian businesspeople
Bulgarian company founders
Bulgarian bankers
20th-century Bulgarian economists
1959 births
People from Gabrovo
Living people
21st-century Bulgarian economists